The Dublin county ladies' football team represents Dublin GAA in ladies' Gaelic football. The team competes in inter-county competitions such as the All-Ireland Senior Ladies' Football Championship, the Leinster Senior Ladies' Football Championship and the Ladies' National Football League.

Dublin played in their first All-Ireland final in 2003 and won their first All-Ireland title in 2010. Between 2014 and 2020 they played in seven successive All-Ireland finals. In 2018 Dublin also won their first League title.

Senior final appearances
All-Irelands
Dublin played in their first All-Ireland final in 2003 and won their first All-Ireland title in 2010. Between 2014 and 2020 they played in seven successive All-Ireland finals.

Ladies' National Football League
In 2018 Dublin won their first League title.

Leinster Senior Ladies' Football Championship

Youth teams
Dublin ladies teams also compete in All-Ireland championships at under-14, under-16 and under-18 levels.

2018 squad
Manager: Mick Bohan
Selectors: Ken Robinson, Niamh McEvoy, Sorcha Farrelly, Seaghan Kearney

Notable players

TG4 Senior Player's Player of the Year

All Stars

Ireland internationals
A number of Dublin ladies' footballers have also represented Ireland at international level in various other sports.

Others
 Joanne Cantwell – RTÉ sports presenter

Managers

Honours
Senior; 
 All-Ireland Senior Ladies' Football Championship 
Winners: 2010, 2017, 2018, 2019, 2020: 5
Runners up: 2003, 2004, 2009, 2014, 2015, 2016, 2021: 7
Ladies' National Football League 
Winners: 2018, 2021: 2
Runners up: 2014 : 1
 Leinster Senior Ladies' Football Championship 
Winners:  2003, 2004, 2005, 2008, 2009, 2010, 2012, 2013, 2014, 2015, 2016, 2017, 2018, 2019: 14 
Youth; 
All-Ireland Under-18 Ladies' Football Championship
Winners: 2008, 2012: 2
Runners up: 1990, 2007, 2011, 2013, 2016 : 5
All-Ireland Under-16 Ladies' Football Championship
Winners: 1989, 2006, 2010: 3
Runners up: 2005, 2011, 2013, 2014, 2016 : 5
All-Ireland Under-14 Ladies' Football Championship
Winners: 2004, 2005, 2007: 3
Runners up: 2006, 2010, 2011, 2018 : 4

References

External links
 dublinladiesgaelic.ie
 Dublin Ladies' Gaelic at sportsmanager.ie

 
Ladies